Satyam Kavyen "Kav" Temperley (born Finlay Beaton; 3 July 1978) is the lead singer, songwriter, bassist and occasional keyboard player of the Australian band Eskimo Joe.

Biography

Early life and education
Temperley was born in Mosman Park, Western Australia, and grew up in Fremantle. At seven years of age, his name was changed to 'Satyam Kavyen Temperley'—Temperley is his mother's maiden name and 'Satyam Kavyen' means "Poet of Truth". The Temperley family were members of the 'Orange People' (Rajneesh movement) and made trips to India as well Oregon, United States, throughout the early 1980s.

Between the ages of seven and 12, Temperley attended the Lance Holt School, a Fremantle community school. At the age of thirteen, he accompanied his mother on a trip to India, where they stayed at the Osho International Meditation Resort in Pune. It was during this trip that he enrolled an international alternative boarding school in Devon called Ko Hsuan that is based on the teachings of controversial Indian mystic Osho. Temperley was accepted as a boarder and remained at the school for a year: Temperley referred to his time at Ko Hsuan as his "saving grace", and it was there that he discovered a passion for music before he returned to Fremantle and John Curtin High School due to homesickness:

Musical career
At the age of seventeen, Temperley met future band member Joel Quartermain during a musical performance by the latter at Temperley's high school. At the time, Temperley was already friends with Stuart MacLeod, as they were neighbours since the age of 6.

At the age of eighteen, Temperley returned to England in an attempt to re-kindle friendships with his former classmates at Ko Hsuan. He subsequently returned to India, where he again stayed at Pune. While in India, Temperley decided to become more serious about his music. In a letter to MacLeod, he states 

Upon his return to Fremantle, Temperley informed Quartermain of his decision; at the time, Quartermain was playing in funk metal band Freud's Pillow. While at university, Temperley, MacLeod and Quartermain formed Eskimo Joe for a Battle of the Bands competition. Initially, Temperley had written a number of folk-type and power pop songs, and he later revealed the band's thinking at the time: 

Temperley sang a reinterpreted version of the song "To Look at You", with INXS, on the 2010 cover version album Original Sin.

In September 2016, Temperley released his debut solo four-track EP Hope Street.

In August 2018 Temperley announced his debut solo record All Your Devotion, self-described as "a collection of ruminating, thoughtful and affecting songs".

In October 2022, Temperley released his second studio album, Machines of Love and Grace.

Discography

Albums

Extended plays 
{| class="wikitable plainrowheaders" style="text-align:center;"
|+ List of EPs
! Title
! Details
|-
!scope="row"|'Hope Street|
 Released: 9 September 2016
 Label: Inertia Recordings 
 Format: digital download
|-
|}

Awards and nominations
APRA Awards
The APRA Awards are presented annually from 1982 by the Australasian Performing Right Association (APRA).

|-
| 2005 
| "From the Sea" (Finlay Beaton, Stuart MacLeod, Joel Quartermain)
| Song of the Year
| 
|-
| 2007 
| "Black Fingernails, Red Wine " (Stuart MacLeod, Joel Quartermain, Kav Temperley)
| Song of the Year
| 
|-
| 2008 
| "New York" (Stuart MacLeod, Joel Quartermain, Kav Temperley)
| Most Played Australian Work
| 
|-
| rowspan="3"|2010  || rowspan="3"|"Foreign Land" (Stuart MacLeod, Joel Quartermain, Steve Parkin, Kavyen Temperley) – Eskimo Joe || Most Played Australian Work || 
|-
| Rock Work of the Year || 
|-
| Song of the Year ||  
|-
| rowspan="2"| 2012 || rowspan="2"| "Love Is a Drug" (Stuart MacLeod, Joel Quartermain, Kav Temperley) || Rock Work of the Year || 
|-
| Song of the Year ||  

Vanda & Young Global Songwriting Competition
The Vanda & Young Global Songwriting Competition is an annual competition that "acknowledges great songwriting whilst supporting and raising money for Nordoff-Robbins" and is coordinated by Albert Music and APRA AMCOS. It commenced in 2009.

|-
| 2009
| "Foreign Land" (Kav Temperley, Joel Quartermain and Stuart Macleod)
| Vanda & Young Global Songwriting Competition
| style="background:silver;"| 2nd
|-

Other activities
A National Office for Live Music was launched by Australian Prime Minister Kevin Rudd in July 2013 and, as of August 2013, Temperley is the state ambassador for Western Australia.

2015: Curated for APRA song hub

2016: Created production Songs From The Suburbs, Songs From The Sea'' for Fremantle Festival

2017: Composed and produced "The Shower Song" for water awareness

Mentor and Educator 
Since 2015, Temperley and (more recently) his partner Beth Ivers have been running songwriting workshops for teens and emerging musicians around the country. Temperley is passionate about the craft of songwriting.

Temperley is also the co-founder (again with partner Beth) of On a Boat Productions, a production house where they create, produce and educate in creative content.

Personal life
Temperley and his ex-wife Abeni Dara are parents of two children.

Temperley lives with his wife Beth Ivers in Fremantle, Western Australia. They live with his two sons, and Ivers' two daughters.

References

1978 births
Living people
APRA Award winners
Australian singer-songwriters
Australian rock bass guitarists
Male bass guitarists
Musicians from Perth, Western Australia
People educated at John Curtin College of the Arts
21st-century Australian singers
21st-century bass guitarists
21st-century Australian male singers
Eskimo Joe members
Basement Birds members
Australian male guitarists
Australian male singer-songwriters